Alcides González (born 4 September 1981) is an Argentine soccer player for Ferrocarril Midland of the Primera C in Argentina.

Teams
  Deportivo Español 2002-2008
  San Marcos de Arica 2009
  San Miguel 2010-2011
  Ferrocarril Midland 2011–present

References

External links
 
 

Living people
1981 births
People from Formosa Province
Argentine footballers
Argentine expatriate footballers
San Marcos de Arica footballers
Primera B de Chile players
Expatriate footballers in Chile
Association footballers not categorized by position